This is a list of the National Register of Historic Places listings in Shenandoah National Park.

This is intended to be a complete list of the properties and districts on the National Register of Historic Places in Shenandoah National Park, Virginia, United States.  The locations of National Register properties and districts for which the latitude and longitude coordinates are included below, may be seen in a Google map.

There are 13 properties and districts listed on the National Register in the park, two of which are National Historic Landmarks.

Current listings 

|--
|}

See also 
 National Register of Historic Places listings in Augusta County, Virginia
 National Register of Historic Places listings in Madison County, Virginia
 National Register of Historic Places listings in Page County, Virginia
 National Register of Historic Places listings in Rockingham County, Virginia
 National Register of Historic Places listings in Warren County, Virginia
 List of National Historic Landmarks in Virginia
 National Register of Historic Places listings in Virginia

References